William Fuller Brown Jr. (21 October 1904 – 1983) was an American physicist who developed the theory of micromagnetics, a continuum theory of ferromagnetism that has had numerous applications in physics and engineering. He published three books: Magnetostatic Principles in Ferromagnetism, Micromagnetics, and Magnetoelastic Interactions.

Biography
William Fuller Brown Jr. was born in Lyon Mountain, New York on September 21, 1904 to William Fuller Brown and Marie E. Williams. An early interest in electromagnetism was stimulated by a toy motor but "destimulated" by high school and college physics courses. He graduated from Cornell University with a BA in English in 1925 and began teaching at Carolina Academy, a private high school in Raleigh, North Carolina. This "restimulated" his interest in physics.

In 1927, Brown enrolled in Columbia University. With S. L. Quimby as his doctoral advisor, he wrote a dissertation on the effect of magnetization on the elastic properties of iron. On August 17, 1936 he was married to Shannon Johnson. He received his PhD in physics in 1937.

In 1938 Brown was appointed assistant professor of physics at Princeton University. It was during this period that he developed micromagnetics. In 1941, he went to the U.S. Naval Ordnance Laboratory, where he headed a team that was working on methods to protect ships against magnetic mines. He developed novel methods for degaussing ships and instrumentation for measuring magnetic fields and the magnetic properties of steels. For his work he was awarded the Meritorious Civilian Service Award by the U.S. Navy.

From 1946 to 1955, Brown worked in Newton Square, Pennsylvania as a research physicist at the Sun Oil Company, investigating dielectric and ferromagnetic phenomena. In 1955 he moved to Minnesota and worked with the 3M Company as a senior research physicist, where there was a strong interest in ferromagnetic single-domain particles.

In 1957 Brown became a professor of electrical engineering at the University of Minnesota. He remained in this position until he became emeritus in 1973, aside from 1962 (when he was a Fulbright scholar at the Weizmann Institute in Rehovot, Israel) and 1963–1964 (when he was guest professor at the Max Planck Institute for Metals Research in Stuttgart). He died in St. Paul, Minnesota in 1983.

Development of micromagnetics
At the time of Brown's graduation from Cornell, the theory for magnetic domains was not very developed. Richard Becker and Werner Döring, in their book Ferromagnetismus, emphasized internal stresses. Brown realized that the most important factor, magnetostatic forces, were "totally ignored". He was strongly influenced by the 1935 paper of Lev Landau and Evgeny Lifshitz, which developed a one-dimensional continuous model for domain wall motion. In 1938 W. C. Elmore published a paper that discussed a three-dimensional generalization of the Landau-Lifshitz theory, but did not attempt to derive the equations. Brown set out to do this.

Brown published his equations in 1940 and applied them to the approach to saturation of magnetization curves. He later said that "nobody paid any attention to them for 16 years", although Charles Kittel said that it was one of the "starting points" for his review of ferromagnetism in 1946.

Honors
In 1967, Brown received an A. Cressy Morrison Award from the New York Academy of Sciences. In 1968 he was elected Fellow of the IEEE and in 1974 was made an Honorary Life Member of the IEEE Magnetics Society. He was also elected Fellow of the American Physical Society in 1938 and the American Association for the Advancement of Science.

Works

Books

Articles

Notes

See also
Brown's theorem
Brown's equations
Néel–Brown theory

References

External links

1904 births
1983 deaths
Cornell University alumni
Columbia Graduate School of Arts and Sciences alumni
University of Minnesota faculty
American materials scientists
Theoretical physicists
20th-century American physicists
Fellows of the American Physical Society
Fulbright alumni